WALO (1240 AM) is a radio station broadcasting a Spanish variety format. Licensed to Humacao, Puerto Rico. The station is currently owned by Ochoa Broadcasting Corp. of the Archilla Munoz family and features programming from Radio Isla.

Translator stations

References

External links

ALO
Radio stations established in 1958
1958 establishments in Puerto Rico
Humacao, Puerto Rico